This is a list of the number-one hits of 1996 on Italian Hit Parade Singles Chart.

References

1996
One
1996 record charts